Monika Žunkovič (born 7 September 1989) is a Slovenian football midfielder. She has played for Davidov Hram Sobota, Pomurje, and Maribor in the Slovenian Women's League.

She was a member of the Slovenian national team.

References

External links
 

1989 births
Living people
Slovenian women's footballers
Slovenia women's international footballers
Women's association football midfielders
ŽNK Mura players
ŽNK MB Tabor players
ŽNK Krka players